Hauhungatahi is an eroded volcano at the southern end of the Taupo Volcanic Zone in New Zealand, located about  WNW of Mount Ruapehu.  Although relatively little-known, at  Hauhungatahi is one of the highest volcanoes in New Zealand, exceeded in elevation by only Ruapehu, Taranaki/Egmont (including Fanthams Peak), and the Tongariro massif (including Ngauruhoe). The volcano is constructed atop an upfaulted block of Mesozoic marine sediments. The age of the erupted andesite lava is about 900,000 years, making Hauhungatahi more than three times as old as the neighboring Ruapehu.

The volcano is located in the western part of Tongariro National Park.  The terrain surrounding Hauhungatahi and covering an area of  has been managed as a Wilderness Area since 1966, one of two such officially designated areas within the park.

The standard ascent route on Hauhungatahi is a tramp from the west side starting near Erua, following remnants of an old track in places, and bush-bashing through several overgrown and boggy areas to reach the bush line near  on the summit plateau.  Slightly easier travel continues eastward to the true summit, which provides panoramic views of neighboring peaks throughout the park including Ruapehu, Ngauruhoe, and Tongariro.

See also
 List of volcanoes in New Zealand
 List of mountains of New Zealand by height
 Volcanism in New Zealand

References

Tongariro Volcanic Centre
Volcanoes of Manawatū-Whanganui